This is a list of notable palaces in Pakistan.

A
Aiwan-e-Sadr

B
Bedi Mahal

D

Darbar Mahal
Derawar Fort

F
Faiz Mahal

G
Gulzar Mahal

K
Khaplu Palace

L
Lahore Fort

M
Mohatta Palace

N

Noor Mahal

O
Omar Hayat Mahal

P
Prime Minister House, Pakistan
Punjab House

S
Sheesh Mahal (Lahore Fort)

W
 White Palace (Marghazar)

Palaces
Palaces
Pakistan